Kamal Mirzayev (born on 14 September 1994) is an Azerbaijani professional footballer who plays as a midfielder for Shamakhi.

Club career
On 28 April 2013, Mirzayev made his debut in the Azerbaijan Premier League for Gabala match against Qarabağ.

On 23 August 2019, Mirzayev signed one-year contract with Al-Salmiya SC.

On 11 July 2022, Gabala announced the departure of Mirzayev.

References

External links
 

1994 births
Living people
Association football midfielders
Azerbaijani footballers
Azerbaijan youth international footballers
Azerbaijan under-21 international footballers
Azerbaijani expatriate footballers
Expatriate footballers in Kuwait
Kuwait Premier League players
Azerbaijan Premier League players
Gabala FC players
AZAL PFK players
Sumgayit FK players
Zira FK players
Al Salmiya SC players
Azerbaijani expatriate sportspeople in Kuwait